David Lindley may refer to:
 David Lindley (musician) (1944–2023), American musician
 David Lindley (physicist) (born 1956), British theoretical physicist and author
 David Lindley (badminton), see 2009 All England Super Series – Mixed doubles

See also
David Armstrong-Jones, Viscount Linley, known professionally as David Linley